Triphyllozoon inornatum is a species of bryozoa in the family  Phidoloporidae.

References

Cheilostomatida
Animals described in 1934